The  Philadelphia Soul season was the ninth season for the franchise in the Arena Football League. The team was coached by Clint Dolezel and played their home games at the Wells Fargo Center. The Soul finished the regular season 9–9, which was good enough for a playoff berth. However, they were eliminated in the first round by the Cleveland Gladiators on a field goal as time expired, losing by a score of 39–37.

Standings

Schedule

Regular season
The Soul began the season with a rematch of ArenaBowl XXVI on the road against the Arizona Rattlers on March 15. Their final regular season game was on July 26 against the Pittsburgh Power on the road.

Playoffs

Roster

References

Philadelphia Soul
Philadelphia Soul seasons
Philadelphia Soul